Maz or MAZ may refer to:
 IATA code for Eugenio María de Hostos Airport, Mayagüez, Puerto Rico
 Minsk Automobile Plant, abbreviated in Belarusian as MAZ
 Myc-associated zinc finger protein, a protein encoded by the MAZ gene
 Maz, a village in Iran
 Mammalian assemblage zone, a collection of fossil mammal bones
 Maz Kanata, a former space pirate in the sequel era of the Star Wars universe
 Bill "Maz" Mazeroski, former American baseball player